KCUT-LP, also known as Moab Rocks Community Radio is a Rock formatted low-power FM broadcast radio station licensed to and serving Moab, Utah.  KCUT-LP is owned and operated by Tunnel Vision Music.

References

External links
 Moab Rocks Community Radio Online
 

2014 establishments in Utah
Rock radio stations in the United States
Radio stations established in 2014
CUT-LP